Communitybuilders is a £70 million programme in the United Kingdom that aims to strengthen the resilience of multi-purpose, inclusive community-led organisations that operate at the neighbourhood level (sometimes referred to as community anchors).

Background 

Government responsibility for Communitybuilders lies jointly with the Department for Communities and Local Government and the Office of the Third Sector.

In June 2009, a consortium, led by the Adventure Capital Fund (ACF) and including Futurebuilders England and the Community Alliance (Development Trusts Association, BASSAC and Community Matters) was appointed to deliver the programme.

Purpose 

Communitybuilders takes forward a commitment within the Communities in Control: Real People, Real Power white paper to build more cohesive, empowered and active communities.

The aim of the Communitybuilders programme is to help community anchor organisations work towards long-term financial stability so they can meet the needs of their communities for generations to come. Communitybuilders provides a mix of loans, grants and non-financial support at different stages of the project cycle, supporting both existing organisations and newly formed organisations

Notes

External links 
 
 The Adventure Capital Fund website
 The Futurebuilders England website
 The Community Alliance website

Social finance
Social entrepreneurship
Defunct public bodies of the United Kingdom